Dennis Bailey may refer to:

 Dennis Bailey (designer), RDI-awarded illustrator/designer
 Dennis Bailey (footballer, born 1935), English association football player
 Dennis Bailey (footballer, born 1965), English association football player
 Dennis Bailey (rugby league), rugby league footballer of the 1990s